Glen Eira College (GEC) is a co-educational, public secondary school located in Caulfield East, Victoria, Australia. It is situated on Booran road and backs on to Caulfield Racecourse Reserve. The current Booran Road school was originally Caulfield High School, which opened in 1962. Glen Eira College is a merger of Caulfield High School, Prahran High School, Caulfield Technical School, Murrumbeena High School and other state schools.

In 2021, GEC was named The Age Schools that Excel winner among government schools in Melbourne’s south.

Curriculum and Programs 
Glen Eira College students study towards the Victorian Certificate of Education (VCE), the main secondary student assessment program in Victoria which ranks students with an Australian Tertiary Admission Rank (ATAR) for university entrance purposes. Practical VCAL subjects can also be combined in subject choices.

The college had a VCE median score of 31 in 2020, 2021 and 2022.

Enrichment program

Glen Eira College provides a Select Entry Accelerated Learning (SEAL) program accredited with The Academy of Accredited SEAL Schools (TAASS) for years 7 to 9.

Language programs  

GEC language options include: 
 French (LOTE, French Immersion and 1st Language Program)
 Japanese (LOTE and Japanese Immersion)
 Hebrew. 
GEC is a member of the Australian Association of French English Bilingual Schools (AAFEBS) and its bicultural French program is accredited by the CNED (French Government distance Education Program). GEC is the only public school in Victoria to offer Hebrew as a language (with support from the Union of Jewish Education Board (UJEB)).

Leadership programs

Glen Eira provides many opportunities for student leadership and shaping the school environment. Additionally, Year 9 students have the opportunity to participate in the School for Student Leadership, a Victorian Department of Education and Training (DET) initiative offering a unique residential education experience at locations such as the Alpine School, Snowy River campus and Gnurad Gundidj campus.

International Student Program

Glen Eira’s highly successful international student program attracts many students from countries including China, Vietnam, Japan, Korea, Cambodia and Colombia.

Student Life 

The college promotes a rich student life experience through engagement in diverse extra-curricular activities and lunchtime clubs. It supports opportunities for students to discover their passions and stretch their abilities. 

GEC students participated in the Model United Nations Summit (2022) and achieved multiple awards and commendations in the Australian History Competition (2021).

International learning enrichment camps offered during school holidays - including Space Camp (US) and French language immersion (Noumea, New Caledonia) - will recommence in 2023 following the Covid travel hiatus.

STEM engagement

In 2022, students achieved commendation in the Science Talent Search (Melbourne University), Algorithmic and Computational Thinking Competition and School Maths Competition (Australian Maths Trust), Maths Olympiad (Outstanding Team Award 2022) and Maths Talent Quest (First Prize 2022).

 Robotics - In 2022, six teams from the newly formed Robotics Club competed in the RoboCup Junior Australia Championships 2022 in Adelaide.
 Chess - In 2022, GEC hosted an Interschool Chess Tournament and competed in chess competitions for the first time, achieving a result of equal 4th in the Chess Victoria Open Secondary State Final and 6th in the Chess Victoria Secondary Girls State Final.

Performing Arts

Glen Eira's performing arts program includes an Instrumental Music Program, and a variety of music ensembles and performance opportunities. In 2021, students performed a four-part harmony for the annual Singfest, sang in the Mass Choir for the Victorian Schools Spectacular at Hisense Arena and performed at Stringfest. 

Sport

In addition to school house sport competitions in Swimming, Athletics and Cross Country, Glen Eira College competes in Victoria's Interschool Sports Beachside Division, Southern Metropolitan Secondary. Sports offered and recent sporting results (no competition 2020-2021 due to Covid) include: 
 Athletics - Victorian All Schools Track & Field Championships 2022 (3 Gold, 2 Silver, 5 Bronze), Junior Boys Athletics 2nd Victorian Nitro Athletics Final & 6th National Nitro Athletics Final 2019, State Champion 2017 Field Athletics (Haddi El Shorbaggy), SMR Athletics Representatives 2016-2017.
 Badminton - Year 8 Boys Badminton Division Winners 2022, Year 7 Girls Badminton Division Winners 2022, Year 7 Boys Badminton Division Winners 2022, Year 8 Badminton Girls and Boys SMR Runners Up 2017, Year 7 Girls Badminton SMR Champions and State Finalists 2016, Year 7 Boys Badminton SMR Runners Up 2016.
 Basketball
 Baseball - Year 7 Boys Baseball Division Winners 2018.
 Cricket
 Cross Country - Overall School Cross Country Division Winners 2022.
 Football - Intermediate Boys Football Division Winners 2022.
 Futsal
 Handball
 Hockey
 Lawn Bowls - Senior Lawn Bowls Division Winners 2018, Year 7 Lawn Bowls Division Winners 2018, Senior Boys Lawn Bowls SMR Champions & State Finalists 2017.
 Netball
 Soccer - Intermediate Boys Soccer Division Winners 2018, Year 8 Boys Soccer Division Winners 2018, Year 7 Boys Soccer Division Winners 2018, Senior Boys Soccer Division Winners 2017.
 Softball - Intermediate Girls Softball SMR Champions & SSV State Finals Runners Up 2018, Year 8 Girls Softball Division Winners 2018, Intermediate Girls Softball SMR Champions 2017, Year 7 Girls Softball SSV State Finals Runners Up 2017, Intermediate Girls Softball Division Winners & SMR Runners Up 2016, Year 7 Girls Softball SMR Champions & State Finalists 2016.
 Swimming - SMR Swimming Representatives 2016-2017
 Table Tennis - Year 7 Boys Table Tennis Division Winners 2017, Year 7 Girls Table Tennis SMR Runners Up 2017.
 Tennis
 Volleyball - Year 7 Girls Volleyball Runners Up 2022.

Facilities 
Glen Eira College’s main buildings, Library, Performing Arts Centre and basketball courts are on the east side of Booran Road. The Language Centre and main sports facilities (including an indoor multi-sports stadium and gymnasium, outdoor tennis/netball courts and multi-sports field) sit across the road, accessed by a pedestrian crossing. 

In 2022, the college completed a 
unique - and self-funded - outdoor sports upgrade to complement the indoor sports stadium. The multi-sports field has line markings for soccer, volleyball, rounders, four square courts, and a sprint track to a connecting long jump pit. Terraced steps in house colours form open ampitheatre seating.

Alumni 
In 2022, Glen Eira College established an alumni program in partnership with not-for-profit Our School.

See also 
 List of high schools in Victoria
 List of schools in Victoria
 Victorian Certificate of Education

References

External links 
 

Secondary schools in Melbourne
Educational institutions established in 1999
1999 establishments in Australia
Buildings and structures in the City of Glen Eira